Innovation Waikato, or Waikato Innovation Park, is New Zealand’s growth hub for Ag-Biotech businesses. It offers commercial tenancies and specialised professional skills support to companies active in the agriculture or biotechnology sectors. In addition, the Park provides commercialisation advice and support to businesses outside the Park and actively pursues global opportunities on behalf of the AgBioNZ Cluster.

The Park is situated alongside the AgResearch Ruakura campus and neighbours the University of Waikato campus in Hamilton. Waikato is New Zealand's heart of primary sector science research (with approximately 1000 research scientists resident in Hamilton), providing Park entrepreneurs with collaborative opportunities grounded in leading science.

Waikato Innovation Park has periodic segments on Rural Delivery, a TVNZ agricultural news and events program.

History and structure
The Park was established to enhance the Waikato region's economic growth. It is sited on 17 hectares of land owned by Tainui and its first building was opened in 2004, housing over 40 commercial tenants.

Waikato Innovation Park's master plan provides for 17 buildings. Construction began in October 2008 on a second building and a third developmental
Spray Drying facility was completed in 2012.

Partnerships
Strategic partnerships have been established with the following organisations, providing park tenants ready access to specialist resources such as laboratories, IT Systems, research capabilities, student support and tertiary programmes:
 The University of Waikato
 AgResearch
 Wintec

Waikato Innovation Park leads and coordinates the AgBioNZ Cluster which was established to encourage active networking, collaboration and innovation between sector-related businesses.

Projects
Waikato Innovation Park has led several collaborative projects leveraging the relationships within and across the AgBio Cluster. These projects deliver value to the commercial sector, span many businesses and prove new technologies to commercial farming operators. Many of the projects are a partnership with the private sector and government or sector agencies such as New Zealand Trade and Enterprise and Meat & Wool NZ.

 Walton Farm Project - Integrated Dairy Farm Management Systems
 Sheep Beef and Deer Project - Integrated Farm Management Systems

Research
Current and previous tenants of Waikato Innovation Park are involved in various areas
of research including analysis of milk (including mastitis detection), telemetry, Spray Dryer design, laboratories, digital libraries, export certification, sustainable intensive farming, automated farm systems, internet connectivity to remote sites and other technology based solutions.

Waikato
Innovation organizations
Agricultural research
Agriculture companies of New Zealand